"Circle of Friends" is the seventh episode of the first season for the television series Dexter. It introduces Mark Pellegrino as Paul Bennett. The Ice Truck Killer is supposedly identified, but Dexter is skeptical. Meanwhile, Rita must deal with the return of her menacing, recently paroled ex-husband.

Plot 
Debra and Batista identify the Ice Truck Killer as Neil Perry, a taxidermist with a history of violent mental illness. After they arrest Perry, he gleefully confesses to the crimes. However, Dexter later meets Perry and suspects he is not telling the truth. LaGuerta sees Perry's arrest as a way to advance her political career, but feels betrayed when her superior, Captain Matthews, takes the credit. Debra approaches Rudy, a prosthetic manufacturer who works at the hospital, and asks him on a date.

Meanwhile, Rita must try to adjust herself when Paul, her recently paroled husband, shows up to visit their children, Astor and Cody. Dexter tries to cover up a past mistake when Jeremy Downs, a victim whom he allowed to escape, is arrested again for a murder charge. Dexter confronts him in a police interrogation room and asks why he killed again. Jeremy admits that he can't feel anything, and he thought that killing would bring him something different. Dexter explains to Jeremy that he is the same way, and tells him only to kill people who deserve to die.

Rita tells Paul that if he can handle supervised visits for six months, then she might consider letting him have unsupervised visitation. When she hands him divorce papers giving these conditions, Paul submits very quickly and signs them. Dexter wants to give Jeremy more of a guiding light, but soon learns he committed suicide in prison; he followed Dexter's advice and killed someone who deserved to die. Dexter, disappointed that the Ice Truck Killer was nothing more than a mentally disturbed psychopath, requests to see him so he can ask questions. After having a short exchange with Perry, Dexter is relieved to surmise that he is not the Ice Truck Killer.

Reception 
Eric Goldman of IGN said: "Dexter  continues to move along at a brisk pace, and this week delivered one of its busiest and best episodes yet."

References

External links

 

2006 American television episodes
Dexter (TV series) episodes